Ryan Madsen Millar (born 22 January 1978) is an American volleyball player, a member of United States men's national volleyball team in 1998–2008, a participant of the Olympic Games (2000, 2004, 2008), 2008 Olympic Champion, three times NORCECA Champion.

Personal life
Millar was born in San Dimas, California. He graduated from Brigham Young University in 2001.

Career
Millar played volleyball at Brigham Young University in Provo, Utah, from 1996-1999.

In 1996, he was named the Volleyball Magazine National Freshman of the Year and was a Third-Team All-Mountain Pacific Sports Federation (MPSF). In 1999, he was named the MPSF Player of the Year and was a First Team American Volleyball Coaches Association (AVCA) All-American. In 1998, he finished second in the nation in blocks per game (2.02) en route to repeating as a First Team All-American. In 1999, he capped off his successful career by leading BYU to the program's first ever NCAA Men's Volleyball Championship and was once again a First Team All-American as he ranked first in the country in hitting percentage (.498) and blocks per game (2.14)

In July 2006, Millar was named as an assistant coach for the BYU men's volleyball team under Head Coach Tom Peterson. In August 2006, Millar was named co-interim head coach of the BYU men's volleyball team after Peterson's sudden resignation.

He has played at the 2000 Olympics, 2004 Olympics and the 2008 Olympics. In 2000, the U.S. men had a disappointing Olympic tournament, failing to win a single match. At Athens, Millar helped the USA men finished fourth overall. During the Olympics, he ranked fourth on the team in scoring with 70 points on 53 kills, and 16 blocks. In 2008, Millar helped Team USA to the gold medal.

Achievements

Clubs

National championships
 2010/2011  Polish Championship, with Asseco Resovia Rzeszów
 2011/2012  Russian Cup, with Lokomotiv Novosibirsk
 2011/2012  Russian Championship, with Lokomotiv Novosibirsk

Individual
 2005 NORCECA Championship - Best Blocker
 2005 FIVB World Grand Champions Cup - Best Blocker
 2007 USA Volleyball - Indoor Player of the Year

External links
 

1978 births
Living people
American men's volleyball players
Volleyball players at the 2000 Summer Olympics
Volleyball players at the 2004 Summer Olympics
Volleyball players at the 2008 Summer Olympics
Olympic gold medalists for the United States in volleyball
BYU Cougars men's volleyball players
People from San Dimas, California
American Latter Day Saints
Medalists at the 2008 Summer Olympics
Sportspeople from Los Angeles County, California
Expatriate volleyball players in Poland
Resovia (volleyball) players
Middle blockers